Elmer Mejorada Jamias (born November 21, 1961) also known as Barako ng Maynila (fearless / tough guy of Manila), is a Filipino police officer. He previously served as Deputy Director of the Directorate of Information and Communication Technology Management from 2017 to 2018.

Law enforcement career
Jamias graduated with the Philippine National Police Academy Class of 1986.  In 1999, Jamias killed a criminal named Mike Ampuan, aka Macmod, responsible for the murders of six police officers; he later received the "Bayaning Pulis" (People's Police) award, which came with a reward of 100,000 Philippine pesos (1960 US$), due to his handling of Macmod. Also in 1999, Jamias was among the recipients of that year's Outstanding Manilan Award.

In June 2015, Jamias was involved in a confrontation with Vice President Jejomar Binay over Binay's son's access to Makati City Hall, during which Binay allegedly assaulted Jamias and other law enforcement officers at the scene.  In August 2015, Jamias was made director of Manila's Eastern Police District (EPD); Jamias denied suggestions that the new post was a reward for his involvement in the confrontation with Vice President Binay several weeks earlier.  On June 14, 2017, Jamias was made Deputy Director of the Directorate of Information and Communication Technology Management.

Politics
In October 2018, Jamias filed his candidacy for the vice-mayoralty of the city of Manila in the 2019 elections. He ran as an independent, and finished third in the results (13,876 votes) behind re-elected Vice-Mayor Maria Sheilah "Honey" Lacuna-Pangan and ex-congressman Amado Bagatsing.

In popular culture
In 2000, Jamias was the subject of a film, Barako ng Maynila, (fearless / tough guy of Manila) inspired by his law enforcement career; Jamias was portrayed by Jinggoy Estrada, son of former Philippine president Joseph Estrada, and the film was directed by Toto Natividad.

Jamias was also the subject of an eponymous series for the True Confessions literary column on Pilipino Star Ngayon. The series, written by Ronnie M. Halos, ran from 2003 to 2004 and is still available online.

References

1961 births
Filipino police officers
Living people
People from Paco, Manila